Bizarre is a 2015 French drama film directed by Etienne Faure and starring Rebekah Underhill. It was screened in the Panorama section of the 65th Berlin International Film Festival. In June and August 2015, Bizarre was screened at The Tel Aviv International LGBT Film Festival 2015.

Cast
 Pierre Prieur as Maurice
 Adrian James as Luca
 Raquel Nave as Kim
 Rebekah Underhill as Betty 
 Luc Bierme
 Charlie Himmelstein as Charlie 
 Michael Glover
 Rita Azar

See also
List of lesbian, gay, bisexual or transgender-related films of 2015

References

External links
 

2015 films
2015 drama films
2015 LGBT-related films
French drama films
English-language French films
French LGBT-related films
LGBT-related drama films
2010s English-language films
2010s French films